Till We Have Faces is a 1956 novel by C. S. Lewis.

Till We Have Faces may also refer to:
 Till We Have Faces (Gary Thomas album), 1992
 Till We Have Faces (Over the Rhine album), 1991
 Till We Have Faces (Steve Hackett album), 1984
 Till We Have Faces, a 2002 album by Noise Ratchet

See also 
 Until We Have Faces, a 2011 album by Red